Yazmany Arboleda is a Colombian American artist based in New York City.  His practice focuses on creating “Living Sculptures: People coming together to transform their experience of the world.” Arboleda lectures internationally on the power of art in public space; and is the Creative Director of MIT's ENGAGE program as well as The Brooklyn Cottage. In 2013, he was named one of Good Magazine’s 100 People Making Our World Better.

From working with a community of artists and activist in Kabul to give away 10,000 pink balloons to adults on a Monday Morning in 2013 to literally highlighting the housing crisis and governmental corruption in Johannesburg's Central Business District by painting them to appear to be bleeding color from their windows and rooftops, his work is motivated largely by political, cultural, and social circumstances.  In 2015, Arboleda has been developing a project titled 'Colour In Faith,' where religious communities across Kenya are working together to paint the exteriors of mosques, temples, and churches yellow in the name of love.  The project was nominated for the Disruption By Design (DxD) in the fall of 2015.

He received his Master of Architecture degree from The Catholic University of America in Washington, D.C. He has also completed art and design programs at Parson's School of Design in New York City, Universitat Politecnica de Catalunya in Barcelona, and Istituto Marangoni in Milan and London. In 2014 he participated in the Juilliard School’s inaugural inter-arts program.

Arboleda writes occasionally for the Huffington Post about art and culture.  For the publication he has interviewed renowned personalities including playwright/journalist/actress and MacArthur Fellow Anna Deavere Smith, Turner Prize winning artist Anish Kapoor, supermodel/actress Lauren Hutton, and Golden Lion Award winning artist Marina Abramović, among others.

Art

Yazmany Arboleda’s practice merges painting, photography, film, sculpture, installation, and participatory
actions in order to highlight phenomena that lie just outside our collective field of vision.  His preoccupations
with social, political and moral issues in a culture ever more driven by the media draw our attention to slight,
often overlooked but extraordinary facets of the man-made world we inhabit today.

Arboleda deconstructs the contemporary human experience by using the very same media prism that shapes
our perspectives from childhood to adult life. His work considers how nature and culture combine to define
standards of human beauty common across time and geography. He explores the way the growing ubiquity
of information has been accompanied by a crumbling of faith in news institutions, government and business.
The work depicts and analyzes inter-connections and influences, and often engages the viewer, knowingly or
not, to become a part of the art itself.

Arboleda's installations include commentary on politics, current events, racism, and sexism, sometimes provoking controversy.

Monday Morning
 
During the past year Arboleda has been traveling the world orchestrating a "Living Sculpture" titled Monday Morning.  The project has been created so far in India, Japan and Kenya.   During the project volunteers give away more than 10,000 balloons of a given color to people who are commuting to work during the time span of Monday Morning.  According to his website, this is part of the artist's Living Industries Projects.  His installations compel viewers to question the true nature, source and ownership of art which can be seen as the explorations of the relationship between art and living materials. The balloons will therefore attempt to transform an ordinary Monday morning into something unique.

According to the BBC, Kenya was on high alert during the giving away of the thousands of balloons in Nairobi since the government sent troops to Somalia in pursuit of al-Shabab militants it blames for a spate of recent kidnappings.

The Keller Gates Project

The Keller Gates Project began on February 28, 2008 in response to socio-political currents in the United States and the New York contemporary art scene. The goal of the project was twofold: to support and encourage a comprehensive and honest debate on the significant roles that race, age, gender and sexual orientation have in American society, and to speak directly to an art world more concerned with what can be monetized rather than what art is or has the potential to be.

Arboleda created or “fabricated” the existence of two art galleries in New York city: the Leah Keller Gallery and the Naomi Gates Gallery. These galleries had corresponding websites, physical addresses (empty parking-lots in the Chelsea neighborhood in Manhattan), and telephone numbers leading to automated voicemails announcing to the caller that there was no one currently available to answer the phone.  The photos of the physical space that appeared online was a collection of photographs of “real” Manhattan galleries taken by the artist himself.

Arboleda digitally removed the artworks that were on display when he took the pictures of the spaces and proceeded to add new works of his own imaginings.  He would later say that all of the art that was published on the sites was  engineered to be as sensational as possible.

After announcing the opening of the exhibitions via email, Arboleda followed up a week later saying that the exhibits had been censored.  The existence and censoring of the “fictitious” shows was reported by over 50 print news outlets around the world including The Village Voice, The New Republic,  El Tiempo (Colombia’s most highly regarded newspaper), as well as Frances Le Monde.  Furthermore, Univision, the TV network with the largest audience of Spanish language television viewers in the United States, lead their National News telecast on March 14, 2008 with this story.

Following this, Arboleda went on to create physical versions of many of the virtual art works people saw online.  One of the works, entitled “Once You Go Barack…” consisting of a 32’ long black phallus, was used to create the video invitation of the “re-opening” of the exhibitions.  In the YouTube video the artist and his friends parade around the city of New York, visiting popular sites such as the Statue of Liberty, the Brooklyn Bridge, and the Empire State Building, promoting very sensational art.

A second wave of media attention occurred when the new physical exhibition was about to open its doors.  According to the New York Times report, concerned citizens call 911 reporting that there was a sign of the façade of building stating “the Assassination of Hillary Clinton” and “the Assassination of Barack Obama.”  In many of the articles that followed, Arboleda discussed the relationship between fact and fiction as well as how media affects contemporary culture.

According to the New York Times, Arboleda's two exhibits, "The Assassination of Barack Obama" and "The Assassination of Hillary Clinton," caused controversy when the work was temporarily censored and Arboleda was detained. The sign for the exhibit was covered and Arboleda was questioned by the United States Secret Service about the themes surrounding the exhibits. According to Arboleda, he was asked "if I owned guns, if I was a violent person, if I had ever been institutionalized." They released him after approximately an hour of questioning.

Arboleda claimed that the word "assassination" wasn't meant literally, and that "the exhibition is supposed to be about character assassination. It’s philosophical and metaphorical." He reported that the Secret Service told him that the exhibition "could incite someone to do something crazy, like break the window. It’s terrible, because they’re violating my rights. If someone breaks a window, they’re committing a crime."

The project continued, in October 2008 Arboleda revealed the entire process  of this project in a one-month exhibition at the Art Directors Club Gallery in New York.  For the exhibit he wallpapered the gallery with thousands of copies of comments from blog posts about the "Assassination" exhibits. During the month of October, the Art Directors Club held two events: the first was a question and answer session between the artist and New York Magazine Contributing Editor Gabriel Sherman; the second event was panel discussion about The Keller Gates Project where Sherman moderated a panel made up of art world professionals: Klaus Biesenbach, Chief Curator of the Department of Media, MoMA, and Chief of the Curatorial Advisors at PS1, Anne Pasternak, Artistic Director and President, Creative Time, Lauren Cornell, Executive Director, Rhizome, and Adjunct Curator, The New Museum, Mario Naves, Artist and Art Critic for the New York Observer.

The New Vitruvians Project

The New Vitruvians, a collection of large-scale artworks, offers a fresh, contemporary perspective on the themes of human beauty, and reveals truths about perceptions of physical ideals, and the social and cultural factors that influence them.  The project’s name is derived from Leonardo da Vinci’s fundamental study of the human form and proportion, the Vitruvian man, which depicts a nude male figure in two superimposed positions inscribed in a circle and square.

At the onset of The New Vitruvians, the artist conducted his own study of the modern proportions and geometry of beauty.  The process began by shooting black-and-white portraits of men and women, chosen to represent the diverse standards of beauty. Each photograph was digitally enhanced to distill its essence in pixilated form. Then, he examined the role of the circle in art and history, and the perfection of its three-dimensional form, the sphere. The two dimensional pixilated images were rendered in three dimensions, printed onto 2,000 to 4,000 one inch spheres per piece, which were then assembled and set by hand into acrylic frames, creating a contemporary interpretation of the pointillistic effect.

Influential Japanese fashion designer Issey Miyake presented the 'New Vitruvians,' Arboleda's first solo art exhibition in New York City, in May 2007.  The exhibition traveled to London's Imagination gallery in the fall of that year. At the London exhibition, new 'ball gowns' made of more than 10,000 crazy balls designed by Arboleda debuted along the 'ball portraits.'

References

External links

Living people
Catholic University of America alumni
American installation artists
Artists from New York City
1981 births